The 2016–17 McDonald's Super Smash (named after the competition's sponsor McDonald's) was the twelfth season of the Men's Super Smash Twenty20 cricket tournament in New Zealand. The competition was run from 4 December 2016 to 7 January 2017. The previous edition was known as the Georgie Pie Super Smash. The Auckland Aces were the defending champions.

The match between Otago Volts and Central Stags on 21 December 2016 set a new record for the highest aggregate total in a T20 fixture, with a total of 497 runs scored.

The Wellington Firebirds beat Canterbury Kings by three wickets in the elimination final, and faced Central Stags in the final on 7 January 2017. The Wellington Firebirds won the final by 14 runs.

Teams

Points table

 Teams qualified for the play-offs

Fixtures

Round-robin

Finals

References

External links
 Series home at ESPN Cricinfo

2016–17 New Zealand cricket season
McDonald's Super Smash
Super Smash (cricket)